The Corpus Christi Church is a Roman Catholic parish church in Għasri, in Gozo, Malta. It forms part of the Roman Catholic Diocese of Gozo. It is under current administration of the Rev. Dr Dominic Sultana.

Elevation to Parish Church
By a decree issued on 19 May 1921, Pope Benedict XV authorised the formation of the Corpus Christi Parish - one of the newest parishes in the diocese - with the Corpus Christi Church as the parish church.

Artwork

The Chancel

The titular altarpiece is The Last Supper by Lazzaro Pisani and is located in the choir. It was commissioned by the then-curator and vice-parish priest the Rev. Fr. Carmelo Caruana. The painting was installed in 1917. By 2007, due to the weight of the canvas itself, creases were forming in the painting and it was getting unstuck from its frame. BOV sponsored the restoration. The restoration was carried out by Emanuel Zammit, from Żejtun following his other works in the Cathedral of the Assumption in Gozo.

The decorator Antonio Agius is responsible for the frame, which was done a year later. This, and his other works in the parish church are considered to be his climax.

Parish Priests

Restoration 
In 2018, after obtaining funds from the EU, the facade (including the bell towers), and the left side of the church are being restored.

Pictures

References 

Għasri
Limestone churches in Malta
20th-century Roman Catholic church buildings in Malta